Carroll v. Town of Princess Anne, 393 U.S. 175 (1968), was a United States Supreme Court case in which the Court held that a state cannot preemptively prohibit persons from holding a public meeting, without first notifying the persons involved, and providing the persons an opportunity to argue the decision, unless moving party can show (per the equivalent of today's Federal Rule of Civil Procedure 65) (1) that they made efforts to give to notice, and (2) explain to the court the reasons why such notice should not be required. The National States Rights Party won the case unanimously.

Background 
A white supremacist group, the National States Rights Party, held a rally in Princess Anne, Maryland on August 6, 1966. They intended to hold another public meeting the following day, but local citizens persuaded a Circuit Court judge to issue a 10-day restraining order, prohibiting the group from holding any rally "which will tend to disturb and endanger the citizens of the County".  The Party was not given any advance notice of the restraining order, nor given an opportunity to argue against it.  The Circuit Court then issued a 10-month restraining order.  The Maryland court of appeals overturned the 10 month order, but upheld the 10 day order.  The Party appealed to the Supreme Court.

Opinion of the Court 
The Supreme Court held that the 14th Amendment's guarantee of due process required the state to provide the group with notice and a hearing before a restraining order could be issued. Justice Black concurred in the judgment. 

The 10 day restraining order was set aside.

Notes and references

External links
 
 

1968 in United States case law
American Civil Liberties Union litigation
United States Supreme Court cases
United States Supreme Court cases of the Warren Court